Andalucía por Sí (AxSí) is an Andalusian nationalist political party founded in 2016, succeeding the late Andalusian Party. Its results in regional and general elections have been mostly residual, but at the local it holds more than 100 councilors and several mayorships.

After the dissolution of the Andalusian Party, Andalusianism lacked a strong party of reference. In February 2016 the platform "Andalucía x Sí" was created, and as a prelude to the party a manifesto called "28 de febrero" was signed by personalities such as Javier Aroca or José Chamizo. In November 2016, in a constituent congress with more than 400 attendees, many of them former activists of the AP. He defined himself as a federalist and left-wing activist, wanting to distance himself from the extinct AP and its errors. During the crisis of the coronavirus disease pandemic in 2020, he proposed, in the town halls where he had municipal representation, to fly the flags of the European Union at half-mast due to the lack of solidarity to help Spain.

Program 
In its political programme, it defends various issues, from the breaking down of the digital divide in the rural world, to the sustainable development of the economy, or a boost for R&D&I policy in Andalusia. It calls for a new agrarian reform in which the interests of productivity take precedence over those of large landowners. It redefines a new historical debt of the State with Andalusia that exceeds 9 billion euros. Likewise, AxSí proposes a renegotiation with the Ministry of Defence for the lease of land used for military purposes. It also proposes a constitutional reform that recognises Andalusia as a historic nation and the Roma people in the Spanish Constitution as a community.

References

2016 establishments in Spain
Andalusian nationalist parties
Political parties established in 2016
Political parties in Andalusia
Left-wing nationalist parties